The Dance Fest Skopje (Macedonian: Танц Фест Скопје, Tanc Fest Skopje) is an international dancing festival in Skopje, Republic of North Macedonia. It was established in 2005, as a continuation of the program "April - the month of dance". The festival's aim is to present contemporary productions of national ballets and other prestige companies from the region, Europe and the world.

Basic ideas

following the developments of modern dance worldwide 
exchanging experiences with artists with other cultural backgrounds
international promoting of Macedonian contemporary dance
inspiring young audiences
educating the audience
to give the audience the possibility to take part in the development of contemporary dance
including the Macedonian dance stage in other European projects

References

External links
Official web site

Festivals established in 2005
2005 establishments in the Republic of Macedonia
Dance in North Macedonia
Festivals in Skopje